Donnacha Ó Dálaigh (born 2002) is an Irish hurler. At club level he plays with Monaleen, while he is also a member of the Limerick senior hurling team. He usually lines out as a forward.

Career

Ó Dálaigh first played hurling at juvenile and underage levels with the Monaleen club, before progressing to adult level. He was at right corner-forward when Monaleen beat Bruff to win the Limerick PIHC title in 2022. Ó Dálaigh later won an All-Ireland club title after beating Tooreen in the final.

After being overlooked at minor level, Ó Dálaigh first played for the Limerick at under-20 level. He came on as a substitute when Limerick were beaten by Kilkenny in the 2022 All-Ireland under-20 final. He made his senior team debut during the 2023 National League.

Career statistics

Honours

Monaleen
All-Ireland Intermediate Club Hurling Championship: 2023
Munster Intermediate Club Hurling Championship: 2022
Limerick Premier Intermediate Hurling Championship: 2022

Limerick
Munster Under-20 Hurling Championship: 2022

References

2002 births
Living people
Monaleen hurlers
Limerick inter-county hurlers